Dr. Otto and the Riddle of the Gloom Beam is a 1985 American science fiction comedy film starring Jim Varney. It was written and directed by John Cherry. It is the first film to feature the Ernest P. Worrell character. However, it has a slightly darker tone than his later films. It was shot in Fall Creek Falls State Park, Boxwell Scout Reservation, and Nashville, Tennessee.

The film is dedicated to famed editor Elmo Williams. A public apology to Williams appears in the end credits, with the promise that if another Dr. Otto film were made, "we'll make it up to you."

Plot synopsis
In a pre-credits scene, Ernest P. Worrell is showing off a new device he has bartered from a guy off the street. He called it a "changing coffin" that transforms the user into any disguise.  Ernest enters the coffin as Vern flips a switch, then Ernest gets pulled in screaming.

Dr. Otto is a mysterious villain with a hand attached on top of his head. He is plotting world domination using his "gloom beam," an electromagnetic device that he uses to launch attacks on financial institutions to erase their contents and cause worldwide chaos. In a broadcast signal intrusion, Dr. Otto announces the "Riddle of the Gloom Beam:"

Dr. Otto's first target is Cincinnati, Ohio, where a bank affected by the Gloom Beam decides to disrupt Dr. Otto's scheme before it can cause world chaos by sending in his archnemesis: all-American boy Lance Sterling, born on the same day in the same hospital as Dr. Otto. While Lance was a gifted child born to loving parents, Dr. Otto was the end result of a botched abortion, neglected by his parents (whom he later kills). To foil Lance, Dr. Otto uses a "changing coffin" and transforms himself into various characters in an effort to stop the heroes: Rudd Hardtack, Australian trainer of child militants; Laughing Jack O'Cockney, pirate captain; Auntie Nelda, the cantankerous elderly woman; and Guy Dandy, wealthy playboy.

Lance and his sidekick Doris Talbert escape each disguise in unusual ways: they survive Hardtack's game of Russian roulette; when Laughing Jack uses Lance as bait to catch a swamp monster, the monster turns out to be an old friend of Lance's, who lets them free; when Auntie Nelda drugs them into a trap, Lance is able to sway Tina (a woman Dr. Otto used as bait) into using Dr. Otto's transporter blanket to get them out; and they stumble into an elevator that leads straight to Dr. Otto's lair during a chase with Guy Dandy. Meanwhile, the gloom beam continues to cause chaos around the world, with comical effects: the President of the United States, for example, is overjoyed that Dr. Otto has effectively wiped out the national debt.

In a climactic showdown, Lance and Doris face off against Dr. Otto, all his disguises, and his robot henchman. In the end, it comes down to Lance choosing between a conspicuously labeled "Right Button" and "Wrong Button." He chooses the Right Button—which he realizes too late that it was not the right button (thus implying that was the subject of the "switch the poles" clue)—and, as massive electric bolts fire off in all directions, the lair self-destructs.

The scene then flash-cuts to Doris, Lance and Tina pushing their car down a road. At a gas station, they encounter Ernest, who informs them that they have had no gas since the money went bad. As they all push the car down the road, Ernest takes his hat off to reveal Dr. Otto's third hand, as he says "Have a nice day, knowhutimean?"

Cast
 Jim Varney as Dr. Otto Von Schnick, mad scientist, and his various disguises:
Rudd Hardtack, Australian trainer of child militants, "he who gambled with brains and a gun."
Laughing Jack O'Cockney, pirate captain, "he who had one eye and yet couldn't see."
Auntie Nelda, cantankerous old woman, "he who served bouillabaisse when he was she." Auntie Nelda made numerous other appearances in Carden & Cherry's other commercials and films.
Guy Dandy, wealthy playboy, "he who had all and yet had none."
Ernest P. Worrell, working-class yokel.
Varney also voices Alex, the "dump," a creature Laughing Jack uses Lance as bait to catch.
 Glenn Petach as Otto's Head Hand  
 Myke R. Mueller as Lance Sterling, All-American boy, gifted from birth yet lacking common sense and a failed Senate candidate.
 Jackie Welch as Doris Talbert, humorless, Lance's more realistic partner.
 Daniel Butler as Slave Willie Kegler, Dr. Otto's robot, a childhood science project. He bears a smiley face that changes with his emotions.
 Esther Huston as Tina Nelson, everywoman from White Plains, New York; Dr. Otto's henchwoman, she grows to sympathize with Lance over the course of the film.
 Henry Arnold as Bank Officer 
 Bill Byrge as Gas Station Attendant 
 Mac Bennett as V.P. # 1  
 David Landon as Bank President Rutherford 
 Mary Jane Harvill as Lance's Mom 
 Winslow Stillman as Lance's Dad 
 Irv Kane as Herr Von Schnick 
 Leslie Potter as Madame Von Schnick

Home media
The film was originally distributed on VHS by GoodTimes Home Video in 1992. It was digitally remastered and released on DVD by Echo Bridge Home Entertainment in 2007, and was later included in the Best of Ernest DVD boxset released by Image Entertainment in 2012.

References

External links

1985 films
1980s science fiction comedy films
Ernest P. Worrell films
Films directed by John R. Cherry III
1985 directorial debut films
1985 comedy films
American children's comedy films
1980s children's films
Films shot in Tennessee
1980s English-language films
1980s American films